Structural maintenance of chromosomes protein 5 is a protein encoded by the SMC5 gene in human.

The structural maintenance of chromosomes' complex underlying mechanisms involved in the dynamics of chromatin dynamics is unknown, and new discoveries are shedding light on the various functions. The SMC complex mediates long-distance interactions that enable higher-order folding of chromatin in interphase. The SMC complex has an ATPase activity, a conserved kleisin, as well as regulatory subunits. SMC protein complexes are involved in DNA repair, transcriptional pathways, regulation of  chromosome segregation, and immunity in Arabidopsis. In eukaryotes the structural maintenance chromosomes consists of cohesin (SMC1 AND SMC3), condensin (SMC2 and SMC4), and SMC5/6 complexes.

Structure 
The Smc5/6 complex was discovered in fission yeast. RAD18 (SMC6), the DNA damage gene in fission yeast, also encodes an SMC-like protein and forms a heterodimeric complex with Spr18 (SMC5) protein. In yeast, SMC5/6 complex has sub-units which consists of SMC5, SMC6 and six nonstructural maintenance of chromosomes (NSE) proteins. Nse1-Nse3-Nse4 subunits bridge the Smc5 head Smc6 and allow the binding of DNA. 

It is involved in the Alternative lengthening of telomeres cancer mechanism.

Role in recombination and meiosis
Smc5 and Smc6 proteins form a heterodimeric ring-like structure and, together with other non-SMC elements, form the SMC-5/6 complex.  In the worm Caenorhabditis elegans this complex interacts with the HIM-6(BLM) helicase to promote meiotic recombination intermediate processing and chromosome maturation.  The SMC-5/6 complex in mouse oocytes is essential for the formation of segregation competent bivalents during meiosis.  In humans, a chromosome breakage syndrome characterized by severe lung disease in early childhood is associated with a mutation in a component of the SMC-5/6 complex.  Patient's cells display chromosome rearrangements, micronuclei, sensitivity to DNA damage and defective homologous recombination.

References

Further reading